Gram is a town with a population of 2,521 (1 January 2022), in Haderslev Municipality in Denmark on the southern part of the Jutland peninsula in Region of Southern Denmark. It is the location of Gram Castle.

Gram was the municipal seat of 
the now abolished Gram Municipality.

Cultural and environmental features
 Gram Natural History Museum is found 2 km north of the town

Notable people 
 Otto Didrik Schack, 3rd Count of Schackenborg (1710 in Gram – 1741) a Danish nobleman and enfeoffed count 
 Jens Hoyer Hansen (1940 in Gram – 1999) a Danish-born jeweller who emigrated to New Zealand in 1952
 Erling Jepsen (born 1956 in Gram) a Danish author and playwright
 Henrik Ruben Genz (born 1959 in Gram) a Danish film director 
 Per Vers (born 1976 in Gram) a Danish rapper, songwriter and performer.

References

Cities and towns in the Region of Southern Denmark
Haderslev Municipality